Aby is a village in the East Lindsey district of Lincolnshire, England. Aby is part of the civil parish of Aby with Greenfield .

History
The village's name is of Old Norse origin, and means "village on a river" (Old Norse á, river, and býr, village).  The villages of Åby in Sweden and Aaby in Denmark have names of identical origin and meaning.

Aby's 13th-century All Saints Church fell into disrepair and was demolished by Sir Henry Vane in 1660.  The stone was removed to Belleau for use on the Manor House. In 1888 a pitch pine chapel was erected on the original site, but all that remains today is the churchyard.

Aby railway station opened in neighbouring Claythorpe in 1848, and closed in 1961. Before the railway line was closed, the village had the distinction of the shortest signal box name on the British network.

The Wesleyan Methodists built a red brick chapel in Aby in 1895. It later closed and is now the Village Hall.

Aby's public house is The Railway Tavern.

There are no schools in the village; the Aby CofE Primary School, which opened in 1852 was closed in 2009. There are seven schools in surrounding Withern, Alford, Well, Willoughby, and Stewton.

Landmarks
Five miles south of Aby in Alford, there is the Alford Manor House Museum. The Claythorpe Watermill and Wildfowl Gardens are in Claythorpe, less than a mile away. Church Farm Museum is located in nearby Skegness.  Bolingbroke Castle is also nearby in Old Bolingbroke.

References

External links 

 

Villages in Lincolnshire
East Lindsey District